The National Stock Exchange (NSX) is an electronic stock exchange based in Jersey City, New Jersey.  It was founded March 1885 in Cincinnati, Ohio, as the Cincinnati Stock Exchange.

In 1995, it moved headquarters to Chicago, Illinois, and it was renamed the National Stock Exchange in 2003. After demutualizing in 2006, it moved headquarters to Jersey City. In 2011, CBOE Stock Exchange acquired the National Stock Exchange, with both exchanges operating under separate names. The NSX ceased trading operations on February 1, 2017, when it was acquired by the  New York Stock Exchange, with plans to re-open trading at an unknown time.

History

Early name changes
National Stock Exchange was founded March 1885 in Cincinnati, Ohio, as the Cincinnati Stock Exchange. In 1976, it closed its physical trading floor and became an all-electronic stock market. The Cincinnati Stock Exchange moved its headquarters to Chicago in 1995, and changed its name to the National Stock Exchange – NSX – on November 7, 2003.  Owned by its members since inception, it demutualized in 2006. It later moved its headquarters to Jersey City, New Jersey. In September 2011, CBOE Stock Exchange (CBSX) entered into an agreement to acquire the National Stock Exchange. The acquisition was completed on December 30, 2011 with both exchanges to operate under separate names. The National Stock Exchange continued to be based in Jersey City.

2014–2015 shutdown
In May 2014, the exchange "changed its pricing structure to charge both sides of a trade a fee for securities priced $1 or more, a departure from other public venues that usually charge one side and pay a rebate to another." With David Harris as chief executive officer, the National Stock Exchange ceased trading operations on May 30, 2014. The exchange stated in a release that it, "continues to be registered as a national securities exchange under Section 6 of the Securities Exchange Act (the "Act") and remains a self-regulatory organization. All NSX rules remain in full force and effect." The closure brought the number of active stock exchanges in the United States to 11, as the CBOE Stock Exchange had closed the month prior. Wrote Bloomberg, "just one public exchange, Chicago Stock Exchange Inc., that isn’t owned Bats, Nasdaq OMX Group Inc. or IntercontinentalExchange Group Inc."
 On February 24, 2015, the NSX was bought by a private entity known as National Stock Exchange Holdings. Trading resumed on December 22, 2015.

NYSE acquisition
The New York Stock Exchange announced it has entered into an agreement to acquire the NSX, subject to Securities and Exchange Commission (SEC) approval. The NSX ceased trading operations on February 1, 2017. NYSE plans to bring it back on its new trading platform Pillar, some time in the distant future.

NSX was to be renamed "NYSE National" as a result of the acquisition by NYSE.

On January 12, 2018 an SEC filing for rule changes was made to support re-activation of NYSE National, Inc. in the second quarter of 2018 (on the Pillar trading platform as previously noted).

Previous exchanges named NSX
Two previous exchanges, both located in New York City, operated as the National Stock Exchange. The first exchange operated for seven months to September 1869. The other, associated with the New York Mercantile Exchange, traded from March 7, 1962 to January 31, 1975.

See also
 List of stock exchanges
 List of stock exchanges in the Americas
 List of stock exchange mergers in the Americas

References

External links
 
 
 On the Pillar Trading platform:
 
 
 

Financial services companies established in 1885
Stock exchanges in the United States
Companies based in Jersey City, New Jersey
History of Cincinnati
1885 establishments in Ohio
Financial services companies based in New Jersey